"Chaos with Ed Miliband" is a phrase from a 2015 tweet by David Cameron, Prime Minister of the United Kingdom, targeting Ed Miliband, Leader of the Opposition. On 4 May – a few days before the 2015 United Kingdom general election – Cameron, the leader of the Conservative Party, wrote on Twitter that the British public faced a choice between "stability and strong Government" with him, or "chaos with Ed Miliband", who was leading the Labour Party into the election. The political turmoil in the United Kingdom in the wake of the 2015 election and Cameron's resignation after the 2016 Brexit referendum made the tweet "infamous".

Purpose and background
Cameron's tweet was intended to focus public attention toward the possibility of a hung Parliament in the wake of the 2015 election and the electoral chaos that might have ensued had the Labour Party under Miliband not secured enough electoral support and been forced to enter into a coalition with the Scottish National Party.

In the televised debates leading up to the election, Cameron stated that "the only way to stop this Ed Miliband SNP government taking place is to have a Conservative majority government". Nicola Sturgeon, the leader of the Scottish National Party, appealed to Miliband in the debate by asking "if Labour and the SNP have more MPs than Cameron, is Miliband really going to say he won't work with us?" In response, Miliband said that "the first budget of a Labour government is going to be written by a Labour government ... It is not going to be written by Nicola Sturgeon or Alex Salmond or anybody else in the SNP" and that "If you want a Labour government, my message is very simple: vote Labour."

Legacy

Led By Donkeys campaign
The tweet was the subject of a billboard campaign by the anti-Brexit political campaign group Led By Donkeys in January 2019. A spokesperson for the group told The Times that the idea for the campaign had come "down the pub" as they were discussing whether Cameron would ever delete the tweet and so they decided to turn it into a "tweet you can't delete".

Use by Miliband
Miliband changed his Twitter handle to "Chaos with Ed Miliband" following the May 2019 resignation of Theresa May as prime minister.

In October 2022 Miliband retweeted the tweet with an emoji of a clown after the resignation of Kwasi Kwarteng as Chancellor of the Exchequer following the September 2022 United Kingdom mini-budget and the ensuing October 2022 United Kingdom government crisis during the premiership of Liz Truss. Miliband's retweet generated 70,000 likes in its first hour.

Media commentary
Writing for Politico in 2018, Paul Dallison listed the tweet as one of seven "tweets to regret". Dan Milmo, writing in The Guardian, listed the tweet as one of the "greatest hits in Twitter's history" in 2022. Milmo described the tweet as "half-right in that it predicted bedlam. But under Cameron's leadership instead. He won, called the European Union referendum and things have been far from stable since. It is now regularly retweeted when the Tories, and the UK, are going through yet another crisis."

References

2015 United Kingdom general election
British political phrases
David Cameron
Ed Miliband
Twitter